Cirilo Tirado Delgado is a Puerto Rican politician and attorney. He served as a member of the Puerto Rico House of Representatives (1973–1985) and Senate (1988–1996).

Biography

Cirilo Tirado Delgado received his Bachelor's and Master's degree from the University of Puerto Rico. He then received his law degree from the Interamerican University of Puerto Rico School of Law, passing the bar exam in 1981. Tirado Delgado also served as teacher for the Puerto Rico Department of Education for 15 years.

Tirado Delgado became a member of the Popular Democratic Party (PPD). He was elected to the Puerto Rico House of Representatives in 1973, representing the District of Guayama until 1985. During the first months of 1985, he served as part of the Cabinet of Governor Rafael Hernández Colón as President of the Industrial Commission. After that, he served as administrator of the State Insurance Fund Commission until 1988. That year, he ran for Senator for the District of Guayama, at the 1988 general elections. Tirado Delgado was reelected at the 1992 general elections.

Tirado Delgado ran again for Senator at the 1996 elections, but lost to the candidates of the New Progressive Party (PNP). After that, he dedicated to work on his law firm in Guayama, Puerto Rico.

Tirado Delgado is married to Quintina Rivera Montañez, a teacher. His son, Cirilo Tirado Rivera, is currently a Senator.

References

External links
Biografía Cirilo Tirado Delgado

Living people
Members of the Senate of Puerto Rico
People from Patillas, Puerto Rico
Popular Democratic Party (Puerto Rico) politicians
Popular Democratic Party members of the House of Representatives of Puerto Rico
University of Puerto Rico alumni
Year of birth missing (living people)